After Business Hours is a 1925 American silent drama film directed by Malcolm St. Clair and starring Elaine Hammerstein, Lou Tellegen, and Phyllis Haver.

Plot
As described in a film magazine review, John King enters married life with the plan of allowing his wife June no money except a few dollars a week. She gambles, loses, and is ashamed to ask her husband for enough to pay her losses. In an effort to repay her losses, she goes into gambling more heavily until her debts increase to a large sum. She gives her pearls as security. Her chauffeur blackmails her for money. To supply him with money, she takes a pin, which her friend Sylvia had dropped at her home, to a pawnbroker, forging Sylvia's signature. The pawnbroker, who had been turned down for membership in John's club, is ambitious to become a member. To force his way into the club, he threatens to disclose the forgery, causing the arrest of June. John fights him and obtains the pin. Returning home, his wife tells him the truth about the pin. He forgives her, taking the blame himself.

Cast

Preservation
A nitrate master of After Business Hours that is missing one of its five reels is in the collections of Library and Archives Canada.

References

Bibliography
 Munden, Kenneth White. The American Film Institute Catalog of Motion Pictures Produced in the United States, Part 1. University of California Press, 1997.

External links

Lobby card at www.gettyimages.com

1925 films
1925 drama films
Silent American drama films
Films directed by Malcolm St. Clair
American silent feature films
1920s English-language films
Columbia Pictures films
American black-and-white films
1920s American films